Gahnia sclerioides is a tussock-forming perennial in the family Cyperaceae, that is native to south western parts of Western Australia.

References

sclerioides
Plants described in 1997
Flora of Western Australia
Taxa named by Karen Louise Wilson